Mosetse is a village in Central District of Botswana. It is located along the road from Francistown to Nata. The population was 1,661 in 2001 census. Mosetse lies along the Mosetse River, which ultimately discharges to the Sua Pan, a part of the Makgadikgadi Pan.

The village lies on the Francistown–Sua Pan railway line, at which point the prospected Mosetse–Kazungula–Livingstone Railway will branch off.

References

Populated places in Central District (Botswana)
Villages in Botswana